Redden Court School is a secondary school with academy status located in Harold Wood, Romford, Havering, England. The school serves 866 students age 11 to 16.

In 2003, the Queen visited the local area of Romford and made a special stop at the school. A student from Redden Court School had written to the Queen asking her to visit.

In 2012, the percentage of pupils achieving 5 A*-C GCSEs (or equivalents) including English and maths GCSEs was 53%.

Houses
Like many schools, Redden Court uses a house system. The houses are: Air, Fire, Water and Earth. These are the four elements. They use those elements to sort different students into teams and they have house points and they get awards for every milestone they reach and each house has a team leader.

References

External links
 Redden Court School website

Academies in the London Borough of Havering
Secondary schools in the London Borough of Havering